Magellan Rise is an oceanic plateau in the Pacific Ocean, which covers a surface area of . There is another geological structure with the same name west from the Marshall Islands.

The Magellan Rise has been called a large igneous province by Coffin and Endholm 2001 and was emplaced 145 million or 135-128 million years ago, possibly as a consequence of intense volcanism at a former triple junction. Alternatively, the Rise was formed by a mantle plume linked to the deep "JASON superplume". Candidate mantle plumes are the Easter hotspot and the Foundation hotspot.

The volume of rocks in the Magellan Rise is about -. It apparently developed first on the Phoenix Plate before being transferred onto the Pacific Plate 125 million years ago. The Magellan Rise never rose to shallow depths at least since the Cretaceous, and the Rise is covered by sediments of Tithonian/Berriasian to Quaternary age.

Notes

References

Sources 

 
 

Underwater ridges of the Pacific Ocean
Plateaus of the Pacific Ocean